Barbara Mary Cameron  (born 16 April 1962) is a Northern Irish international lawn bowler and bowls coach.

Bowls career

International
In 1993, she won the pairs gold medal with Phillis Nolan at the inaugural Atlantic Bowls Championships. Two years later she won the pairs bronze medal at the Atlantic Championships.

She competed for Northern Ireland in the women's pairs event at the 2014 Commonwealth Games where she won a bronze medal.

National
In 2001, Cameron won the singles crown at the Irish National Bowls Championships, bowling for Ballymena BC. In 2022, she won the triples title.

Coaching
Cameron was selected as a coach for the Northern Ireland team for the 2018 Commonwealth Games on the Gold Coast in Queensland.

Cameron was awarded the British Empire Medal (BEM) in the 2020 Birthday Honours for services to lawn bowls in Northern Ireland.

References

1962 births
Living people
Bowls players at the 2014 Commonwealth Games
Commonwealth Games bronze medallists for Northern Ireland
People from Coalisland
Female lawn bowls players from Northern Ireland
Commonwealth Games medallists in lawn bowls
Recipients of the British Empire Medal
Medallists at the 2014 Commonwealth Games